Why Not Me is the debut studio album by American country music duo The Judds. It was released on October 15, 1984 by RCA Nashville and was produced by Brent Maher. Why Not Me was recorded in a traditional acoustic format using only a handful of musicians. It contained a collection of ten tracks, including their previously released single, "Mama He's Crazy." It also included three singles that would become number one hits: the title track, "Girls' Night Out" and "Love Is Alive."

Why Not Me received positive reviews from critics following its release. Critics praised the album's production detail as well as the duo's vocal harmonies. The album topped the Billboard country albums chart and reached other charts as well. The record would become The Judds' first full-length studio album and their most successful studio release to date. It has since received sales certifications from both the United States and Canada. The album has been reissued several times in different formats.

Background
In 1983, The Judds (mother Naomi and daughter Wynonna Judd) signed their first recording contract with RCA Records in Nashville, Tennessee. The same year, they recorded their first album, a collection of six songs that comprised a "mini-album" entitled Wynonna & Naomi. The album included the duo's first major hit, "Had a Dream (For the Heart)." However, RCA had yet to release a full-length album by the pair. With the success of their debut single, the mother-daughter team were informed by RCA they would release their first full-length album. In addition, the label was going to include "Mama He's Crazy," a single that had been spawned from their mini-album offering. A music video was also to be made in correlation with the promotion of the record.

Content and recording
The Judds recorded Why Not Me between May and July 1984 at the Creative Workshop, a studio located in Nashville. The duo had previously cut Wynonna & Naomi at the same location in sessions produced by Brent Maher. He would also produce their debut studio offering. Maher co-wrote the album's title track with Harlan Howard and Sonny Throckmorton. In her 1993 autobiography, Naomi Judd considered the song to have "one of the strongest melodic hooks I'd ever heard." Bandleader and guitarist, Don Potter, created guitar "licks," which Judd called in her book to be "a little slice of heaven." Also included on the album was Naomi Judd's composition entitled "Mr. Pain." According to Judd, the song merged the stories of her friends' previous relationships and the conflicts that arose from them. Songwriter Kent Robbins collaborated with Judd on the track. He also wrote the song "Love Is Alive" for the album as well. Also included was a cover version of Jody Reynolds' "Endless Sleep."

In addition, Maher and Potter collaborated on the track "Sleeping Heart," which Judd called "sweetly sad" in her autobiography. Also included was the song "Bye Bye Baby Blues", which was also written in collaboration between Harlan Howard, Brent Maher and Sonny Throckmorton. As a producer, Maher chose a select group of session musicians for the album's recording. This included Don Potter, as well as Eddie Bayers on drums, Mark Casstevens on guitar, Bobby Ogdin on keyboards and Sonny Garrish on steel guitar. These musicians (among others) were previously included on the sessions for the duo's Wynnona & Naomi album. According to Judd's autobiography, Maher "liked to leave the room for the listener's imagination," with the use of minimal acoustic arrangements. Maher himself later commented on the album in an interview explaining that the album has withstood the test of time. He also commented that he was happy to have worked with The Judds in creating their first full-length studio project.

Critical reception

Why Not Me received mostly positive reviews from critics following its release. In October 1984, Billboard magazine took notice of the album's attention to detail and highlighted several tracks in their review: "The meteoric success story of this duo is no accident. It's predicated on exactly the kind of purity, acoustic brilliance and attention to detail that shines here on the sisters' first full album". Music journalist Robert Christgau gave the album a mostly favorable response, but disliked the production style at times, giving it a "B" rating: "After defying convention by indulging not a single soppy song on their tryout EP, they've flabbed the follow-up several times. And I bet they get even more complacent."

Meanwhile, Thom Jurek of Allmusic gave the effort five out of five possible stars. Jurek called the album a "bona fide classic" and praised its "soaring harmonies" as well as the lead vocals from Wynonna Judd. He also noticed a connection between neo-traditional country and classic country from the early 60s, drawing comparisons to Patsy Cline. Jurek concluded by saying, "Of all their recordings, Why Not Me is their best-known, best-selling, and deservedly so. It's perfect."

Release and chart performance
Prior to its release, "Mama He's Crazy" had already become a number one single on the Billboard Hot Country Songs chart. In September 1984, the title track was released as the first proper single. It spent a total of 22 weeks on the Billboard country songs chart before also reaching the top position that December. The song also peaked at number three on the Canadian RPM Country Singles chart. On October 15, 1984, the album itself was officially released on RCA Records. The album was issued originally as a vinyl LP, cassette and compact disc. In February 1985, the album reached number one on the Billboard Top Country Albums chart, becoming their first album to do so in their career. It would spend a total of 195 weeks on the list. In March 1985, Why Not Me peaked at number 71 on the Billboard 200 albums chart after a 26-week run.

With the success of the title track, "Girls' Night Out" was issued as the album's second single in January 1985. Spending 22 weeks on the Billboard country chart, it also topped the list. It reached the same position on the Canadian country singles chart as well. "Love Is Alive" was released in May 1985 and was the album's final single spawned. By August, the song had also topped the Billboard country chart and the became the duo's fourth number one single. It was the duo's third number one single in Canada as well. Why Not Me was also The Judds' first studio album to sell beyond 500,000 copies in the United States. In April 1985, the album certified gold for this sales achievement by the Recording Industry Association of America. In 1986, the company certified the album platinum in sales for exceeding one million copies. Then, in 1992 Why Not Me received a certification of two-times platinum for sales exceeding two million copies.

Track listing

Vinyl version

Cassette version

Compact disc versions

Personnel
All credits are adapted from the liner notes of Why Not Me.

The Judds
 Naomi Judd – harmony vocals
 Wynonna Judd – lead vocals

Musical personnel
 Eddie Bayers – drums
 Mark Casstevens – harmonica, rhythm guitar
 Sonny Garrish – dobro, steel guitar
 Bobby Ogdin – piano
 Don Potter – acoustic guitar, bandleader
 Gene Sisk – piano
 Jack Williams – bass

Technical personnel
 Bill Brunt – art direction
 Mario Cassill – photography
 Brent Maher – producer
 Brian Maher – engineer
 Joe Funderburk – assistant engineer
 Glenn Meadows, Inc. – mastering

Charts

Weekly charts

Year-end charts

Certifications

Release history

References

Books

External links
 "Why Not Me" by The Judds at Wynonna Judd's official website

1984 albums
The Judds albums
RCA Records albums
Curb Records albums
Albums produced by Brent Maher